Wasteland or waste land may refer to:
 Desert or barren area
 an uncultivated area of land, whether wooded or not, whether common land or not

Art, entertainment, and media

Comics
 Wasteland (DC Comics), 1987–1989 anthology-style horror/humor comic by John Ostrander and Del Close
 Wasteland (comics), 2006–2015 comic book series by Antony Johnston and Christopher Mitten
 Wastelands, setting of Old Man Logan and its several spin-offs, since 2008
 Marvel's Wastelanders, 2021 ongoing series of radio drama podcasts produced by SiriusXM

Fictional entities
 Wasteland (Warhammer), a fictional region in the world of Warhammer Fantasy
 Wasteland, the post-Great War United States in the Fallout series of video games
 Wasteland, a world in which Epic Mickey and Epic Mickey 2: The Power of Two take place

Films 
 Wasteland (1960 film), a 1960 French film directed by Marcel Carné, based on Hal Ellson's novel Tomboy
 Waste Land (film), a 2010 documentary about Brazilian trash-pickers
 Wasteland, North American title of the 2012 British film The Rise
 Wasteland (2013 film), a zombie horror film
 Waste Land (2014 film), a Belgian thriller directed by Pieter Van Hees
 Mad Max: The Wasteland, The fifth film in the Mad Max franchise
The Wasteland (2020 film), an Iranian drama film
The Wasteland (2021 film), a Spanish horror drama film

Games
 Wasteland (video game), a 1988 computer role-playing game
 Wasteland 2, a 2014 sequel to the above game
 Wasteland 3, 2020 sequel

Literature
 Wasteland (mythology), the Celtic motif of the land of the Fisher King
 Wasteland (novel), a 2003 novel by Francesca Lia Block
 "Wastelands" (short story), a 2002 short story by Stephen Dedman
 The Dark Tower III: The Waste Lands, a 1991 novel by Stephen King
 The Waste Land, a 1922 poem by T. S. Eliot
 Wastelands: Stories of the Apocalypse, a 2008 anthology of post-apocalyptic fiction

Music

Albums
 Wasteland (The Jam album), 1992
 The Waste Lands (album), a 1992 album by Venom
 Wasteland (Atargatis album), 2006
 Grace/Wastelands, a 2009 album by Pete Doherty
 Wastelands (album), a 2013 album by Eskimo Joe
 Wasteland (Riverside album), 2018
 Wasteland (Brent Faiyaz album), 2022

Songs
 "Wasteland" (Billy Idol song), 1993
 "The Wasteland" (Elton John song), 2001
 "Wasteland" (Poison song), 2002
 "Wasteland" (Maxïmo Park song), 2005
 "Wasteland" (10 Years song), 2005
 "Wasteland" (The View song), 2007
 "Wasteland" (Needtobreathe song), 2014
 "Wastelands" (Linkin Park song), 2014
 "Wastelands" (Suede song), 2018
 "Wasteland", a song by Against the Current from the album In Our Bones
 "Wasteland", a song by All That Remains from the album Victim of the New Disease
 "Wastelands", a song by Amoral from the album Beneath
 "Wastelands", a song by Avantasia from the album The Wicked Symphony
 "Wasteland", a song by Chelsea Grin from the album Desolation of Eden
 "Wastelands", a song by Extol from the album Extol
 "Wastelands", a song by Hawkwind from the album Alien 4
 "Wasteland", a song by The Jam from the album Setting Sons
 "Wasteland", a song by John Cale from the album blackAcetate
 "Wastelands", a song by Midge Ure from the album The Gift
 "Wasteland", a song by The Mission from the album God's Own Medicine
 "Wasteland", a song by Shadows Fall from the album Fire from the Sky
 "Wasteland (Vechnost)", a song by Silent Planet from the album The Night God Slept
 "Wasteland", a song by Trapt from the album Only Through the Pain

Television
 Wasteland (American TV series), an American television drama, debuted in 1999
 Wasteland (Czech TV series), a Czech television series
 Wasteland Speech, a 1961 speech by FCC chairman Newton N. Minow

Other uses
 Wasteland (event), a bi-annual fetish event held in Amsterdam, The Netherlands
 Wasteland Weekend, an immersive post apocalyptic event held annually in the Mojave Desert since 2010

See also
 Waste (disambiguation)